Nilton Correia Pequeno (born 6 April 1998) is a Santomean footballer who plays as a forward for Minas Argozelo and São Tomé and Príncipe national team.

International career
Tati made his professional debut with the São Tomé and Príncipe national team in a 2–1 2021 Africa Cup of Nations qualification win over Ghana on 28 March 2021.

References

External links
 
 

1998 births
Living people
São Tomé and Príncipe footballers
São Tomé and Príncipe international footballers
Association football forwards
G.D. Tourizense players
São Tomé and Príncipe expatriate footballers
São Tomé and Príncipe expatriates in Portugal
Expatriate footballers in Portugal